All Funked Up is the third album by British rock/R&B band Snafu, released on Capitol in 1975.

The band's line-up for this album included keyboardist Brian Chatton, who had previously played with the Warriors, Flaming Youth, and Jackson Heights.

Critical reception
AllMusic called the album "a notable piece of mid-'70s British rock music [that] deserves to be released for collectors and fans alike." Hi-Fi News & Record Review wrote that it "proves to be their most cohesive [album] to date."

Track listing

Re-released as Angel Air CD SJPCD032

Personnel

Musicians
Bobby Harrison - lead vocals
Mel Collins - saxophone
Micky Moody - guitar
Brian Chatton - keyboards
Tim Hinkley - piano, organ
Colin Gibson - bass
Terry Popple - drums, percussion
Liza Strike, Viola Wills - backing vocals

Technical
Bob Potter -  producer, engineer
Ian Vincentini - sleeve concept
Philip Pace - front photography
Mixed at Island Studios, London, Summer 1975.

References

External links
 "Lock and Key" on Supersonic, 12 June 1975.

Snafu (band) albums
1975 albums
Capitol Records albums